Barclay Church may refer to:

Barclay Viewforth Church, Edinburgh
Dalmuir Barclay Church, Clydebank